Steatoda quinquenotata is a species of spiders of the family Theridiidae that is endemic in Cape Verde. It was first described as Theridion quinquenotatum by John Blackwall in 1865.

References

Further reading
Blackwall (1865) Descriptions of recently discovered spiders collected in the Cape de Verde Islands by John Gray, Esq. Annals and Magazine of Natural History, ser. 3, vol. 16, p. 80-101

Steatoda
Spiders of Africa
Spiders described in 1865
Taxa named by John Blackwall
Arthropods of Cape Verde
Endemic fauna of Cape Verde